{{DISPLAYTITLE:C11H16O}}
The molecular formula C11H16O may refer to:

 Jasmone
 Various aromatic alcohols with one benzene ring
 Various aromatic ethers such as benzyl tert-butyl ether
 Various aromatic alcohols or phenols such as pentamethylphenol.

Molecular formulas